The 1982 America East men's basketball tournament was hosted by the higher seeds in head-to-head matchups. Colgate, Maine and Vermont did not qualify for the 1982 tournament. The final was held at Matthews Arena on the campus of the Northeastern University. Northeastern gained its second consecutive and second overall America East Conference Championship and an automatic berth to the NCAA tournament with its win over Niagara. Northeastern was given the 11th seed in the East Regional of the NCAA Tournament and won in the first round against Saint Joseph's 63–62, but lost in the second round to Villanova 76–72.

Bracket and Results

See also
America East Conference

References

America East Conference men's basketball tournament
1981–82 ECAC North men's basketball season